Nebraska Highway 64 is a highway in Nebraska.  There are two segments to the highway.  The western segment lies in Butler County between U.S. Highway 81 and Nebraska Highway 15.  The eastern segment goes through Saunders and Douglas counties between U.S. Highway 77 and U.S. Highway 75.

Route description

Western segment
The western segment of Nebraska Highway 64 begins at an intersection with U.S. Highway 81 on the Butler/Polk County border south of Columbus.  It goes east through farmland to Bellwood, then ends at an intersection with Nebraska Highway 15 north of David City.

Eastern segment
The eastern segment of Nebraska Highway 64 begins at an intersection with U.S. Highway 77 south of Fremont.  It then proceeds east through farmland, then briefly north near Leshara. After meeting Nebraska Spur 78J, it turns east, crosses the Platte River, then turns northeast and meets the U.S. Highway 275 freeway northwest of Valley.  The two highways run concurrent until just northwest of Waterloo.  They separate, and NE 64 goes east as a divided highway past the Elkhorn River into increasing areas of residential and commercial development and meets Nebraska Highway 31 in the Elkhorn neighborhood of Omaha.  The road continues east on a divided highway which is called West Maple Road.  Between 108th Street and 102nd Street in Omaha, NE 64 meets Interstate 680.  The highway then becomes Maple Street and continues east, becoming a two lane road as it passes through the Benson neighborhood.  East of the Benson business district, at an intersection with Nebraska Link 28K, NE 64 becomes divided highway again, and goes east, then south along Northwest Radial Highway, then east  along Cuming Street, and terminates at a freeway interchange with U.S. Highway 75 near Creighton University.

History
Prior to the construction of the US 275 freeway in the Valley area, Nebraska Highway 64 used to go through Valley on what is now Reichmuth Road, though it is often locally known as Old Highway 275.  This road parallels the Union Pacific railroad tracks.

The east end of Nebraska Highway 64 has also been altered with the reconstruction of the Interstate 480/U.S. Highway 75 interchange.  The east end was at the one way pair of Cuming and Burt Streets, with Cuming going west and Burt going east, but with reconstruction, Cuming Street was modified into a two way road at its interchange with US 75.

Major intersections

Western segment

Eastern segment

References

External links

Nebraska Roads: NE 61-80

064
Transportation in Butler County, Nebraska
Transportation in Saunders County, Nebraska
Transportation in Douglas County, Nebraska
Transportation in Omaha, Nebraska